Šnipiškės (also known as New City Centre) is a neighborhood in Vilnius, the capital of Lithuania. Located on the north bank of the river Neris, it became the site of a modern business district with skyscrapers which, however, mix with some historical wooden architecture.

Until recently, the area was a small historical suburban village north of the Vilnius Old Town. Several skyscrapers, including Europa Tower business center, have been erected since the turn of the millennium. It continues to rapidly expand with major projects for modern commercial and apartment complexes as well as recreational areas. Some of the late 19th and early 20th century wooden houses are now under cultural protection and preservation. Šnipiškės is also home to the Kalvarijos Market.

Etymology

Šnipiškės was named after a rich merchant Povilas Šnipka (Šnipis), who lived in the 16th century, and owned the land plots in the area. During the Interwar period various tourist guides in Vilnius used the Šnipiškis spelling.

Its alternative names in other languages include: ; .

History
Šnipiškės was first mentioned in the historic documents of Vilnius in the 16th century. In 1536, in order to improve connection with the Vilnius city (the Old Town), Sigismund I the Old, the Grand Duke of Lithuania, ordered Ulrich Hosius to build a bridge over Neris, today known as the Green Bridge. It was a wooden bridge with masonry pillars and gates as well as rooms for the bridge guards and customs officers. Šnipiškės developed near the bridge as a suburb of Vilnius.

In the second half of the 17th century, Šnipiškės were governed by the Astikai family and later by Eustachijus Valavičius. Over the time, various plots of land in this area were owned by Valerijonas Protasevičius, the bishop of Vilnius, and the Oginskiai family. In the 17th century, Šnipiškės were mostly owned by the Sapiega family and in 1697 a land plot near Neris was donated to the Jesuit Order by Kazimieras Sapiega.

Gallery

See also
Church of St. Raphael the Archangel, Vilnius

References

Neighbourhoods of Vilnius